The mixed 4 × 100 metre medley relay event in swimming at the 2014 Summer Youth Olympics took place on 22 August at the Nanjing Olympic Sports Centre in Nanjing, China.

Results

Heats
The heats were held at 11:06.

Final
The final was held at 19:29.

References

Swimming at the 2014 Summer Youth Olympics
Youth Olympics